Pedro Hernández García (born 31 October 2000) is a Mexican professional footballer who plays as a centre-back for Liga MX club León.

Career statistics

Club

References

External links
 
 
 

Living people
2000 births
Association football defenders
Club León footballers
Liga MX players
Sportspeople from Monterrey
Footballers from Nuevo León
Mexican footballers